Francisco Javier Calvo Quesada (born 8 July 1992) is a Costa Rican professional footballer who plays as a centre-back for Konyaspor and  the Costa Rica national team.

Early life
After starting with Deportivo Saprissa as a youth player from 2005 to 2010, Calvo moved to the United States to study at San Jacinto College after getting a scholarship and played football at university level during that period.

Club career
On his return to Costa Rica in 2011, Calvo played for Herediano before a stint at Pérez Zeledón where he scored 5 goals in 21 matches. In January 2013 he moved abroad to play for then Danish champions Nordsjælland but he returned to Herediano in summer 2013. In January 2015, Calvo joined Santos de Guápiles as a loan.

In late May, Francisco joined Saprissa. In his first season with Saprissa, he appeared in 39 matches and scored five goals. The following season, he continued to be a set-piece threat as he scored 9 goals in 24 matches playing as a defender.

On 27 December 2016, Calvo joined Major League Soccer side Minnesota United FC.
In 2018, Calvo was selected as an MLS All-Star, becoming the first Minnesota United player in club history to receive the honor.

On 3 May 2019, Calvo was traded to Chicago Fire. Following the 2021 season, Calvo's contract option was declined by Chicago.

On 26 January 2022, Calvo signed as a free agent with San Jose Earthquakes. On 5 March 2022, Calvo scored two late set piece goals for a ten-man San Jose team to salvage a 3–3 draw at home against the Columbus Crew. This performance led to him being named in the MLS Team of the Week. He now plays at Konyaspor in the Turkish Süper Lig.

International career
On 29 May 2011, Calvo made his debut with the Costa Rica senior team in San José in a friendly game against Nigeria. He was also part of the Costa Rica squad at the 2011 FIFA U-20 World Cup.

Calvo was also a reserve call-up for Costa Rica at the 2011 CONCACAF Gold Cup, and later impressed senior head coach Ricardo La Volpe to win him a call-up for the Costa Rica squad at the 2011 Copa América. He made his debut in the competition in a game against Colombia, which ended in a 1–0 loss, and played in a 2–0 win against Bolivia. also Francisco played Argentina in a 3–0 loss.

In May 2018, Calvo was named in Costa Rica’s 23-man squad for the 2018 FIFA World Cup in Russia. He later reprised the same role at the 2022 FIFA World Cup in Qatar.

Career statistics

Club

International

International goals
Scores and results list Costa Rica's goal tally first.

Honours
CS Herediano
 Liga FPD: Clausura 2012

Deportivo Saprissa
 Liga FPD: Apertura 2015, Apertura 2016

Individual
 MLS All-Star: 2018
 CONCACAF Nations League Finals Best XI: 2021

References

External links

1992 births
Living people
Footballers from San José, Costa Rica
Association football defenders
Costa Rican footballers
Costa Rica international footballers
Costa Rica under-20 international footballers
C.S. Herediano footballers
Municipal Pérez Zeledón footballers
FC Nordsjælland players
Deportivo Saprissa players
Santos de Guápiles footballers
Minnesota United FC players
Chicago Fire FC players
San Jose Earthquakes players
Liga FPD players
Danish Superliga players
Major League Soccer players
Costa Rican expatriate footballers
Expatriate men's footballers in Denmark
Expatriate soccer players in the United States
Costa Rican expatriate sportspeople in Denmark
Costa Rican expatriate sportspeople in the United States
2011 CONCACAF Gold Cup players
2011 Copa América players
2015 CONCACAF Gold Cup players
Copa América Centenario players
2017 Copa Centroamericana players
2017 CONCACAF Gold Cup players
2018 FIFA World Cup players
2019 CONCACAF Gold Cup players
2021 CONCACAF Gold Cup players
2022 FIFA World Cup players
Junior college men's soccer players in the United States